Claraville is a locality in the Shire of Croydon, Queensland, Australia.

Geography
The Norman River forms part of the western boundary.

Road infrastructure
The Gulf Developmental Road (National Highway 1) runs along a short section of the northern boundary.

Education 
There are no schools in Claraville. The nearest schools are in Normanton (P-10) and Croydon (P-6). There is no secondary Years 11 and 12 schooling available in the area.

References 

Shire of Croydon
Localities in Queensland